Lake Canopus is a small lake  above the southern shore of Lake Vanda in Wright Valley, Victoria Land. It was named by the Eighth Victoria University of Wellington Antarctic Expedition, 1963–64, after Canopus, pilot of Menelaus, the king of Sparta.

References
 

Lakes of Victoria Land
McMurdo Dry Valleys